Skinjob(s) or skin job(s) may refer to:

Fiction
 Replicant, or "skin-job", in the Blade Runner franchise
 Humanoid Cylons, or "skinjobs", in the Battlestar Galactica franchise

Music
 Skinjobs, a Canadian queercore band
 Skinjob, a 1990 album by False Virgins featuring David Aaron Clark
 "Skin Job", a 1985 song by Live Skull from Bringing Home the Bait
 "Skin Job", a 2000 song by Primitive Radio Gods from White Hot Peach
 "Skin Job", a 2019 song by Chemlab from Tape Decay

See also
 Haujobb, a German band named for the German version of "skinjob" from Blade Runner